For the Japanese era, see Keian (1648-1652).
 

 was a Japanese Buddhist monk who studied classics under Ishō at Nanzen-ji.

Keian accompanied the 1466 mission to the Ming court in China.  In Beijing, he was favored by the Chenghua Emperor. Keian delayed his return to Japan until 1475.

Keian was the first to translate Zhu Xi's Collective Commentaries on the Great Learning into Japanese.

Keian founded Satsunan-gakuha, a neo-confucianist school in Kagoshima.

See also
 Dōgen
 Eisai
 Ingen

Notes

References
 Iwao, Seiichi, Teizō Iyanaga, Susumu Ishii, Shōichirō Yoshida et al. (2002).  Dictionnaire historique du Japon (Vol. I),  (Vol. II). Paris: Maisonneuve & Larose. ;  OCLC 51096469
 Ponsonby-Fane, Richard Arthur Brabazon. (1962).  Sovereign and Subject. Kyoto: Ponsonby Memorial Society. 
 Xinzhong Yao. (2005). An Introduction to Confucianism. Cambridge: Cambridge University Press. 	; ; 

1427 births
1508 deaths
Zen Buddhist monks
Japanese scholars of Buddhism
Japanese philosophers
Japanese religious leaders
Japanese Zen Buddhists
Rinzai Buddhists
People from Shimonoseki